Robert E. "Rob" Morsberger (August 9, 1959 – June 2, 2013) was an American singer-songwriter and classically trained composer. As a sideman/arranger, his credits include Patti Smith, the Grammy-winning Boardwalk Empire soundtrack album, My Morning Jacket, Crash Test Dummies, Marshall Crenshaw, Willie Nile, Jules Shear, Loudon Wainwright III, and more.

Personal life
Morsberger was born in Ohio, raised in Oxford, England and studied composition at the University of Edinburgh. He composed music for PBS programs including Masterpiece Theatre, NOVA and Frontline. He was composer for the award-winning PBS series NOVAscienceNOW for its first five seasons. Morsberger was diagnosed with grade 4 Glioblastoma in September 2011. After he was diagnosed with brain cancer he concentrated solely on his own career, including the 2012 albums A Part of You and Midnight Garden, the latter being a collaboration with his friend Brad Roberts of the Crash Test Dummies. He had been working on a documentary about living with terminal brain cancer.

Death
He died on June 2, 2013 at age 53. Prior to his death, he lived with his family in the Hudson Valley, just north of New York City.

Discography

Solo
 A Periodic Rush of Waves (2006)
 The End of Physics (2008)
 Relativity Blues (2008)
 The Chronicle of A Literal Man (2010)
 Ghosts Before Breakfast (2011)
 A Part of You (2012)
 A Gesture and a Word (2013)

Collaborations
 Midnight Garden (with Brad Roberts)(2012)

References

External links

List of reviews at robmorsberger.com

1959 births
2013 deaths
Singer-songwriters from Ohio
Alumni of the University of Edinburgh
Deaths from brain cancer in the United States